HD 201507, also designated HR 8095, is a white-hued star located in the equatorial constellation Equuleus. It has an apparent magnitude of 6.43, placing it near the limit for naked eye visibility.

There have been disagreements in classifying the star's spectrum. Eugene A. Harlan found a spectral classification of F5 IV, indicating that it is a F-type subgiant that is evolving towards the red giant branch. On the other hand, Nancy Houk and Carrie Swift (1999) found a class of F2 V, indicating that it is still on the main sequence.

HD 201507 has 1.45 times the mass of the Sun and a slightly enlarged radius of  due to its evolved state.

References 

Equuleus
F-type subgiants
Durchmusterung objects
201507
8095
Equulei, 13
104481